Lillian Lorraine (born Ealallean De Jacques; 1892/1894 – April 17, 1955) was an American stage and screen actress of the 1910s and 1920s, best known for her beauty and for being perhaps the most famous Ziegfeld Girl in the Broadway revues Ziegfeld Follies during the 1910s.

Early years

Lorraine was born in Utah as Ealallean De Jacques (her publicity claimed she was born on New Year's Day in San Francisco, California) to Mollie and Charles Jacques (or De Jacques). Her father was a miner whose roots were in St. Louis. Her mother's maiden name may have been Mary Ann Brennan. The U.S. census of 1900 shows that she and her parents resided in Leadville, Colorado at her maternal step-grandfather's hotel, and gives her birthdate as January 1894, her name as Lillian Jacques, and her place of birth is given as Utah. (Her father's place of birth is given as Kansas, and her mother's as Maine.)

Career 
Lorraine began her career on stage in 1906, aged 12 or 14. The following year, she appeared as a minor performer in a Shubert production, The Tourists. It was in that show that she was discovered by Florenz Ziegfeld. He spent the next several years promoting her career, rocketing her into an ascendance which made her one of the most popular attractions in his Follies. In 1909, Ziegfeld pulled 17-year-old Lorraine from the chorus line in that year's production of Miss Innocence to spotlight her as a solo performer who became celebrated for introducing the song "By the Light of the Silvery Moon".

In his book Scandals and Follies, author Lee Davis writes that, "By 1911, [Ziegfeld] was insanely in love with Lillian Lorraine and would remain so, to one degree or another, for the rest of his life, despite her erratic, irresponsible, often senseless behavior, her multiple marriages to other men, his own two marriages and his need for all his adult life to sleep with the best of the beauties he hired." The relationship, both professional and romantic, between Ziegfeld and Lorraine, led to the demise of his marriage to actress Anna Held. (A fictitious character, Audrey Dane, clearly based on Lorraine was portrayed by Virginia Bruce in the sanitized 1936 motion picture The Great Ziegfeld.) Lorraine and Ziegfeld's relationship was turbulent and emotionally complex, but their passion was such that Ziegfeld's second wife, actress Billie Burke, confessed that Lorraine was the only one of Ziegfeld's past sexual entanglements that aroused her jealousy. She starred in many annual productions of The Ziegfeld Follies as well as the 1912 Broadway musical Over the River. She ventured into motion pictures with limited success, appearing in about ten films between 1912 and 1922, including the serial Neal of the Navy with William Courtleigh, Jr.

Personal life
Lorraine's personal life earned her more notoriety than either her talent or her beauty, and she was a staple in newspapers of the day with accounts of her latest turbulent romance or feuds with rival stars such as Fanny Brice and Sophie Tucker. Her personality and private life reportedly was a large influence on Anita Loos in the creation of the character of Lorelei for the novel Gentlemen Prefer Blondes. Although her affair with Ziegfeld was over by the end of the 1910s, her box-office drawing power kept her in a number of his productions of the period. Lorraine's fame began waning in the 1920s and she worked for a period in vaudeville.

Marriages
Lorraine married her first husband, Frederick M. Gresheimer, on March 27, 1912, after they met on a beach. Ten days later, Lorraine announced that the marriage had been a mistake and that the couple was "incompatible" due to her career. The marriage was later found to be invalid because Gresheimer had not divorced his first wife. Lorraine and Gresheimer remarried in May 1913. Three months later, Lorraine filed to have the marriage annulled after claiming that Gresheimer misrepresented himself.

Around 1946, she reportedly wed Jack O'Brien, an accountant. According to Lorraine's biographer, Nils Hanson, no record of any such marriage exists, and the marriage was likely common-law.

Final years and death
Lorraine disappeared from public view in 1941, sometimes going by her mother's purported maiden name, Mary Ann Brennan. She died on April 17, 1955 in New York City. She was widely believed to have been 63 years old at the time of her death but may have been 61. Her funeral, which was held at Holy Name of Jesus Catholic Church, was attended by her Jack O'Brien and two friends. She initially was buried in a pauper's grave in Calvary Cemetery in Queens, New York. Her body later was exhumed and moved to a friend's family plot in Saint Raymond's Cemetery, Bronx.

Broadway credits

Filmography

In popular culture
 The first biography of Lorraine, Lillian Lorraine: The Life and Times of a Ziegfeld Diva by Nils Hanson, was published in October 2011 by McFarland Press.
 Lorraine was portrayed by Valerie Perrine in the 1978 film Ziegfeld: The Man and His Women (Columbia Pictures).
 Lorraine is mentioned as an acquaintance of characters in Jennifer Egan's 2017 novel Manhattan Beach (New York: Scribner Press).

Footnotes

References

External links

Frederick Gresheimer Mugshot, NYC Department of Records 

1890s births
1955 deaths
Date of birth unknown
20th-century American actresses
Actresses from Utah
Actresses from Colorado
American musical theatre actresses
American silent film actresses
American stage actresses
Vaudeville performers
Ziegfeld girls
Burials at Saint Raymond's Cemetery (Bronx)
20th-century American singers
20th-century American women singers